The men's 100m breaststroke events held at the 2020 World Para Swimming European Championships were held at the Penteada Olympic Pools Complex.

Medalists

Results

SB4
Final

SB5

SB6

SB7

SB8

SB9
Heats

Final

SB11

SB12

SB13

SB14

References

2020 World Para Swimming European Championships